Captain Frederick William Hedges  (6 June 1896 – 29 May 1954) was a British recipient of the Victoria Cross, the highest and most prestigious award for gallantry in the face of the enemy that can be awarded to British and Commonwealth forces. A soldier with The Bedfordshire Regiment during the First World War, he was awarded the VC for his actions on 24 October 1918, during the Battle of the Selle.

Early life
Frederick Hedges was born on 6 June 1896 at Umballa in India, the seventh of nine children. His father was serving in the British Army as a bandmaster. By 1901, the Hedges family was living in Hounslow, Middlesex. He was educated at Grove Road Boys' School, and Isleworth County School.

First World War
On the outbreak of the First World War, Hedges volunteered for the British Army and was posted as a rifleman to the 9th (County of London) Battalion, London Regiment (Queen Victoria's Rifles). The regiment was part of the 13th Infantry Brigade, 5th Division, and in November 1914, it was sent to the Western Front in France where it served for several months, including during the First Battle of Ypres. Hedges suffered frostbite and was evacuated to England in January 1915 for treatment. He had recovered within a couple of months and returned to the London Regiment.
 
Hedges was commissioned into the Bedfordshire Regiment in July 1915 and after a period of training at Felixstowe, served as a musketry instructor for several months in England. However, in September 1916, he returned to the Western Front, this time to 6th Battalion, Bedfordshire Regiment. He fought in the Battle of the Ancre in November 1916 and in the Battle of Arras the following year, during which he was wounded in the hand. After a period of treatment at Rouen, he was sent to England for further medical care at Portsmouth and then at Osbourne House at the Isle of Wight.

Hedges did not return to the frontlines until September 1918, having served briefly as a machinegun instructor on recovering from his wounds. Promoted to full lieutenant, he was attached to the 6th Battalion, The Northamptonshire Regiment, as his original unit had been disbanded. On 24 October 1918, the battalion was involved in the Battle of the Selle. Leading a company of the battalion near the village of Hecq, northeast of Bousies, Hedges, with another soldier, captured two machinegun posts that were holding up the advance. A few days later, during an engagement in the Mormal Forest, he was wounded in the head and shoulder. He was evacuated to England for treatment on 8 November 1918. 
For his actions on 24 October he was awarded the Victoria Cross (VC). The VC, instituted in 1856, was the highest award for valour that could be bestowed on a soldier of the British Empire. The citation for Hedge's VC read: 

Following his recovery, he received his VC in a ceremony at Buckingham Palace on 15 May 1919. The next month, he was placed in command of a prisoner of war camp in Guildford. Not long afterwards, he married his fiancée, Mollie , in Hounslow, Middlesex. In late September, he was injured in a motorbike accident and suffered a fractured leg. He was discharged from the British Army before the end of the year.

Later life
After leaving military service, Hedges found employment with the Cornhill Insurance Company. He was instrumental in the setting up of a memorial to former students of his old school at Isleworth County who had been killed during the war and was also involved in the British Legion. In 1924, his first son, John Grosvenor Hedges, was born. During the Second World War, both father and son served in the Home Guard. However, in 1941, John died in a drowning accident on the Thames.

After the war, Hedges and his wife moved to Harrogate in Leeds where he was to run Cornhill's office there. He was never at ease with the shift and he became affected by depression. On 29 May 1954, the anniversary of John's death, he committed suicide, hanging himself at his home. His mental state had worsened since he had to take early retirement from his work. His remains were cremated.

Victoria Cross
After his death, Hedges' medals, which in addition to the VC, also included the 1914 Star, the Victory Medal, the British War Medal, and the 1937 and 1953 Coronation Medals, were loaned to the Leeds City Museum. They are now in the care of Bedfordshire and Hertfordshire Regiment, displayed at the gallery located in Wardown Park Museum, Luton, Bedfordshire.

References

Bibliography

External links

Location of grave and VC medal (North Yorkshire)

1896 births
1954 deaths
British World War I recipients of the Victoria Cross
Bedfordshire and Hertfordshire Regiment officers
British Army personnel of World War I
British Home Guard soldiers
Suicides by hanging in England
Queen Victoria's Rifles soldiers
British Army recipients of the Victoria Cross
British military personnel who committed suicide
Military personnel of British India